The GWR 0-4-0ST steam locomotives were acquired by the Great Western Railway at the 1923 grouping.  They came from small railways (mostly in South Wales) and from contractors.  Some of them survived into British Railways ownership in 1948 and a few are preserved.

Details

Gallery

See also
 Locomotives of the Great Western Railway

References

Sources
 Ian Allan ABC of British Railways Locomotives, winter 1957/8 edition, part 1, page 25

External links
 Rail UK database

0-4-0ST locomotives
0-4-0ST
Andrew Barclay locomotives
Hudswell Clarke locomotives
Hawthorn Leslie and Company locomotives
Kitson locomotives
Peckett locomotives
Avonside locomotives
Shunting locomotives